is a 1984 Japanese fantasy and science fiction anime television series produced by Sunrise. It was broadcast on Nippon Television from October 5, 1984, to March 29, 1985.

Production
The series premiered on TV in October 1984 and lasted 25 episodes. It was directed by Ryōsuke Takahashi, with mechanical design by Kunio Okawara and Yutaka Izubuchi.

Plot
Set in a far flung medieval-looking world of Arst, Prince Jordy Volder takes up the fight against the ambitions of the conqueror Marder. Jordy uses the legendary giant robot "panzer" Galient, which is one of many panzers that have been preserved underground for thousands of years. Using an army of advanced robot panzers, Marder is conquering all of Arst in preparation of his plan for dominance of the Crescent Galaxy.

Theme music
Opening Theme: "The Galient World – Run For Your Life" by EUROX
Ending Theme: "Hoshi no Ichibyō" (lit. "A Second of a Star") by EUROX

The show's opening and ending musical themes were composed and performed by EUROX, a Japanese progressive rock band formed in 1984 in Tokyo, Japan. They also did English versions of both songs which has mostly different lyrics from the Japanese version. They also did a 2009 remake of both songs in both languages.

The ending theme of the show was normally accompanied by nighttime shots of a sword stuck in the sand and images of the characters reflected on its blade as the credits flash on screen with the ending showing the same sword now being showered with rain (as reference to a line in the song about crying).

The final episode was different, with a tighter daylight shot on the sword that pans up to the handle. Prince Jordy's hand then pulls the sword from the sand and lifts it up in the air and we see him embracing Chururu. The credits flash onscreen as the Prince and Chururu look at each other as the images of the prince's mother and friends appear onscreen with rose petals blowing in the wind completing the ending.

References

External links

1984 anime television series debuts
1985 Japanese television series endings
1986 anime OVAs
Japanese adult animated science fantasy television series
Fantasy anime and manga
High fantasy television series
Mecha anime and manga
Military science fiction
Nippon TV original programming
Sunrise (company)
Bandai Namco franchises